Nimrod Tishman (נמרוד טישמן; born May 12, 1991) is an Israeli professional basketball player for Maccabi Rishon LeZion of the Israeli Basketball Premier League. He played college basketball for the University of Florida before playing professionally in Israel.

College career
Tishman successfully represented Israel at the 2009 European Under-18 Championships in France, leading the team with 8.3 points, 4.0 rebounds and 2.3 assists for the tournament. 

Florida Gators associate head coach Larry Shyatt recruited him. Tishman had to be cleared by the NCAA because of his international status, and it was not until October 2009 that he could play for the team.  Tishman returned home after the 2009–2010 season to play professionally after playing limited minutes, the last game being against the LSU Tigers.

Professional career
Tishman did not play during the 2010–2011 season. He went undrafted during the 2011 NBA Draft. 

In July 2011 Hapoel Gilboa Galil signed him to a contract.

On July 27, 2015 he signed with Maccabi Kiryat Gat after playing for Hapoel Gilboa Galil from 2011 to 2014

On August 15, 2016 he signed with Maccabi Ashdod B.C.

On September 14, 2017, he returned to Maccabi Kiryat Gat for a second stint, signing a one-year deal. Tishman helped Kiryat Gat to reach the 2018 Liga Leumit Finals where they eventually lost Hapoel Be'er Sheva.

On July 9, 2018, he signed a two-year deal with Maccabi Rishon LeZion.

On July 20, 2021, he signed with Ironi Ness Ziona of the Israeli Basketball Super League (IBSL).

References

1991 births
Living people
Florida Gators men's basketball players
Hapoel Gilboa Galil Elyon players
Ironi Nes Ziona B.C. players
Israeli men's basketball players
Israeli expatriate basketball people in the United States
Maccabi Ashdod B.C. players
Maccabi Kiryat Gat B.C. players
Maccabi Rishon LeZion basketball players
Point guards
Shooting guards
Sportspeople from Tel Aviv